Minuscule 130 (in the Gregory-Aland numbering), ε 596 (Soden), is a Greek-Latin minuscule manuscript of the New Testament, on paper leaves. Palaeographically it has been assigned to the 15th century. It has some marginalia.

Description 

The codex contains the text of the four Gospels on 229 paper leaves (size ), with one lacuna in John 19:12-21:25. Paper is white, the ink is black. The text is written in two columns per page, 26 lines per page (size of column 20.6 by 6.5 cm), in black ink. The large initial letters in colour and rubricated.

It is a curious copy, with the Latin and Greek in parallel columns, right column is Greek.

Text 

The Greek text of the codex is a representative of the Byzantine text-type. Hermann von Soden classified it to the textual family Kx. Aland did not place it to any Category. According to the Claremont Profile Method in Luke 1 and Luke 20 it belongs to the textual family Kx. In Luke 10 no profile was made.

In Luke 2:38, in the Latin text, it has the reading "Israel" for "Jerusalem".

History 

The scribe was a Latin. The Greek text is often adapted to the Latin one.

The manuscript was examined by Birch about 1782. C. R. Gregory saw it in 1886.

It is currently housed at the Vatican Library (Vat. gr. 359), at Rome.

See also 

 List of New Testament minuscules
 Biblical manuscript
 Textual criticism

References

Further reading 

 

Greek New Testament minuscules
Manuscripts of the Vatican Library
15th-century biblical manuscripts
Vulgate manuscripts